Constance Mabel Jeans (23 August 1899 – 31 March 1984) was an English competitive swimmer who represented Great Britain in the Olympic Games.  She competed in the 100-, 300- and 400-metre individual freestyle events, and the 4×100-metre freestyle relay at the 1920 and 1924 Summer Olympics.  She won two silver medals in the relays and finished fourth in three individual events.

References

External links

profile

1899 births
1984 deaths
Sportspeople from Nottingham
English female swimmers
English female freestyle swimmers
Olympic swimmers of Great Britain
Swimmers at the 1920 Summer Olympics
Swimmers at the 1924 Summer Olympics
Olympic silver medallists for Great Britain
Medalists at the 1924 Summer Olympics
Medalists at the 1920 Summer Olympics
Olympic silver medalists in swimming